Diana Sokołowska (born 19 February 1996, in Sokółka) is a Polish swimmer. She competed in the 4 × 200 metre freestyle relay event at the 2012 Summer Olympics.  Starting in the fall of 2017, she will compete for the Nevada Wolf Pack swimming & diving team.

References

1996 births
Living people
Olympic swimmers of Poland
Swimmers at the 2012 Summer Olympics
People from Sokółka
Sportspeople from Podlaskie Voivodeship
Polish female freestyle swimmers
Nevada Wolf Pack women's swimmers
20th-century Polish women
21st-century Polish women